The 2022 Australian federal election was held on 21 May 2022 to elect all 151 members of the Australian House of Representatives and 40 of 76 members of the Australian Senate. Of those, 15 MPs and 6 senators were elected to represent the state of Western Australia. In this election, the Australian Labor Party led by Anthony Albanese took 4 House seats from the opposing Liberal Party of Australia, thereby gaining the majority of Western Australia's lower house seats for the first time since 1990. The Liberals under Scott Morrison lost a total of 6 seats, including all but 2 of its seats in the Perth metropolitan area. 

The results in Western Australia were the subject of significant media attention on election night, as the swing towards Labor in the state was much higher than every other state and territory at 10.55%, and the swing was large enough to deliver a Labor majority government. Labor not only picked up all three seats that they targeted in their campaign—namely Pearce, Swan and Hasluck—but also won the formerly safe Liberal seat of Tangney in one of the biggest upsets of the election. In addition to the seats won by Labor, the Division of Curtin was won by teal independent candidate Kate Chaney, while Stirling was lost due to abolition. Vince Connelly, Stirling's final MP, attempted to transfer to the Division of Cowan, but was unsuccessful.

Labor's two party preferred result in Western Australia of 55.00% is its best performance, tied with its result (also 55.00% in Western Australia) in its 1983 landslide election win.

This election was held using Instant-runoff voting. In Western Australia in this election, there were two "turn-overs".  In Curtin, an Independent candidate who did not lead in the first count took the seat in the end, and in Tangney, Labor won the seat despite trailing on first preferences.

Overall results

Results by division

Brand

Burt

Canning

Cowan

Curtin

Durack

Forrest

Fremantle

Hasluck

Moore

O'Connor

Pearce

Perth

Swan

Tangney

References

Western Australia 2022
2022 Australian federal election